Yum is a rural locality (a selo) in Yurlinskoye Rural Settlement, Yurlinsky District, Perm Krai, Russia. The population was 222 as of 2010. There are 5 streets.

Geography 
Yum is located 17 km northwest of Yurla (the district's administrative centre) by road. Komarikha is the nearest rural locality.

References 

Rural localities in Yurlinsky District